Milan Jovanović (Serbian Cyrillic: Милан Јовановић, ; born 21 July 1983), also known locally as Mrva, is a Montenegrin retired footballer. In international competition he has represented Montenegro as well as fifteen clubs, although he never played for a Montenegrin club. He announced the end of his professional football career in October 2015.

Club career
Born in Čačak, SR Serbia, SFR Yugoslavia, Jovanović started playing football at a major local club, FK Borac Čačak. Before coming in 2003 at FC Vaslui, he also played for FK Mladost Lučani and FK Železnik. After one season at FC Vaslui, Jovanović was transferred to FC Universitatea Craiova. In 2005, he turned back in Serbia, and played for the second division team FK Radnički Niš. Unirea Urziceni was the team that brought Jovanović again to Romania in 2006. In 2007 the new promoted Universitatea Cluj, bought the Montenegrin footballer with 119.000 €. On 20 February 2009 Spartak Nalchik have signed the Montenegro international defender from Romanian club U Cluj. His contract with Spartak Nalchik has been canceled and at the end of March he arrived in Red Star Belgrade on trial. On 8 June 2009, he signed a 2-year-contract for Austria's record-champion Rapid Wien.

Red Star Belgrade
On the morning of 27 June 2012, Jovanović signed a 2-year-contract for Red Star Belgrade. After an impressive half season with Red Star, Jovanović was thrown out of the senior team because of partying with alcoholic beverages in Antalya, Turkey. In April 2013, after a second alcoholic beverage-related incident, Jovanović formally terminated his contract with Red Star Belgrade.

Padideh
On 14 May 2014, Jovanović signed a two-year contract with Iran Pro League side Padideh, effective from 1 June 2014. He made his debut for Padideh in a 0–0 draw against Malavan on 1 August 2014.

International career
Despite being born in Serbia, Jovanović received a call from the Montenegro to play for its newly formed national team in 2007 and opted to play for Montenegro. He made his debut for Montenegro in his country's first ever competitive match on 24 March 2007, a friendly against Hungary in Podgorica and has earned a total of 36 caps, scoring no goals. On 12 October 2010, spectators were impressed when Jovanović shot a spectacular 30-meter ball which hit the goalpost in a 0–0 draw with England at Wembley Stadium.

His final international was an October 2014 European Championship qualification match against Liechtenstein.

Career statistics

References

External links
 
 
 

1983 births
Living people
Sportspeople from Čačak
Serbian people of Montenegrin descent
Association football central defenders
Serbia and Montenegro footballers
Montenegrin footballers
Montenegro international footballers
FK Borac Čačak players
FK Mladost Lučani players
FK Železnik players
FK Radnički Beograd players
FC Vaslui players
FC U Craiova 1948 players
FK Radnički Niš players
FC Unirea Urziceni players
FC Universitatea Cluj players
SK Rapid Wien players
PFC Spartak Nalchik players
Red Star Belgrade footballers
FC Lokomotiv 1929 Sofia players
Shahr Khodro F.C. players
Siah Jamegan players
Second League of Serbia and Montenegro players
First League of Serbia and Montenegro players
Liga II players
Liga I players
Austrian Football Bundesliga players
Russian Premier League players
Serbian SuperLiga players
First Professional Football League (Bulgaria) players
Persian Gulf Pro League players
Serbia and Montenegro expatriate footballers
Expatriate footballers in Romania
Serbia and Montenegro expatriate sportspeople in Romania
Montenegrin expatriate footballers
Montenegrin expatriate sportspeople in Romania
Expatriate footballers in Austria
Montenegrin expatriate sportspeople in Austria
Expatriate footballers in Russia
Montenegrin expatriate sportspeople in Russia
Expatriate footballers in Bulgaria
Montenegrin expatriate sportspeople in Bulgaria
Expatriate footballers in Iran
Montenegrin expatriate sportspeople in Iran